Jeff Tomsic is an American film producer, writer and director.

His short film I'm Having a Difficult Time Killing My Parents debuted at the Sundance Film Festival in 2011. Following this, he was attached to a number of projects which remained in development hell. In this time he was active in television working as a director and executive producer on the Comedy Central series Idiotsitter and This Is Not Happening.  In 2018 he made his film directorial debut with the film Tag.

References

External links

 Official website

Living people
American film directors
American television directors
Year of birth missing (living people)